Adeshina is both a surname and a given name from the Yoruba ethnic group of West Africa. It means "crown opens the way." Notable people with the name include:

Adeshina Lawal (born 1984), Nigerian footballer
Ademola Adeshina (born 1964), Nigerian footballer
Saidu Adeshina (born 1983), Nigerian footballer

See also
Adesina